The BET Honors were established in 2008 by the Black Entertainment Television network to respect the lives and achievements of African-American luminaries. The awards will be presented annually and broadcast on BET during Black History Month.

Ceremony Location
The inaugural ceremonies, in 2008, were held at the Warner Theatre in Washington, D.C.

Hosts
Comedian Cedric the Entertainer hosted the first BET Honors in 2008.

Actress Gabrielle Union has hosted the BET Honors consecutively for the past five years

2008

Honorees
Alicia Keys (Entertainment Award)
Tyra Banks (Media Award)
Dr. Cornel West, University Professor in the Center for African American Studies (Award for Education)
Richard Parsons (Corporate Citizen Award)
The Honorable Maxine Waters (Public Service Award)
CEO Janice Bryant Howroyd (Entrepreneur Award)

Performers and Presenters
Stevie Wonder
John Legend
Gladys Knight
Wyclef Jean
Jill Scott
Brian McKnight
Ne-Yo
Raheem DeVaughn
Blair Underwood
Danny Glover
Kerry Washington
Idris Elba
Hill Harper
Vivica A. Fox

2009

Honorees
Magic Johnson  (Corporate Citizen Award)
Tyler Perry    (Media Award)
B. Smith       (Entrepreneur Award)
Mary J. Blige  (Entertainer Award)
Judith Jamison (Education Award)
James Clyburn  (Public Service Award)

Performers and Presenters
Stevie Wonder
Yolanda Adams
Anita Baker
Monica
Joss Stone
Ne-Yo
Queen Latifah
Anthony Hamilton
Keyshia Cole
Whitney Houston

2010

List of Honorees
Whitney Houston    (Entertainers Award)
Queen Latifah      (Media Award)
Sean “Diddy” Combs (Entrepreneur Award)
Ruth Simmons       (Education Award)
Keith Black  (Public Service Award)

Performers and Presenters
Jennifer Hudson
Mary J. Blige
India.Arie
Patti LaBelle
Stevie Wonder
Trey Songz
Jazmine Sullivan
Kim Burrell

2011

Honorees
Jamie Foxx (Entertainer)
Cicely Tyson (Theatrical Arts Award)
Herbie Hancock (Musical Arts Award)
Iman (Service Award)
Lonnie Bunch (Education Award)
Linda Johnson-Rice (Media Award)

Performers and Presenters
Ne-Yo
Nicole Ari Parker
Boris Kodjoe
Chick Corea
Lalah Hathaway
Keyshia Cole
Tank & Guy
Naturally 7
Trey Songz
Yolanda Adams
Marsha Ambrosius

2012

Honorees
 Maya Angelou  (Literary Arts Award)
 Stevie Wonder     (Musical Arts Award)
 Mariah Carey  (Entertainer Award)
 Spike Lee         (Media Award)
 Beverly Kearney   (Education Award)
 Tuskegee Airmen (Service Award)

Performers and Presenters
 Michelle Obama
 Willow Smith
 Aretha Franklin
 Common
 Cuba Gooding Jr.
 Terrence Howard
 Cicely Tyson
 Kelly Rowland
 Jill Scott
 John Singleton
 Jennifer Hudson
 Ledisi
 Patti LaBelle
 Anthony Hamilton
 Luke James
 Nick Cannon and his son Moroccan Cannon

2013

Honorees
Halle Berry(Service Award)
T.D. Jakes (Education Award)
Chaka Khan  (Musical Arts Award)
Lisa Leslie (Athletics Award)
Clarence Avant (Entrepreneur Award)

2014

Honorees
Kenneth Chenault (Corporate Citizen Award)
Aretha Franklin  (Musical Arts Award)
Carrie Mae Weems (Visual Arts)
Ice Cube (Entertainer Award)
Berry Gordy (Entrepreneur Award)
Nelson Mandela (Leadership Award)

2015
Comedian Wayne Brady hosted.

Honorees
Kanye West (Visionary Award)
Usher  (Musical Arts Award)
Phylicia Rashad (Theatrical Arts Award)
Dr. Johnnetta Betsch Cole (Education Award)
Kwame Simmons (Digital Special Recognition)
John W. Thompson (Technology and Business Award)

Performers and Presenters
 Ne-Yo
 Trey Songz
 Ben Vareen
 K. Michelle
 Dame Dash
 Patti LaBelle
 Mary J. Blige
 Bobby Brown
 Charlie Wilson
 Glynn Turman
 Diahann Carroll
 Anthony Anderson

2016
Comedian Arsenio Hall hosted the final ceremony.

Honorees
Lee Daniels (The BET Honors Television and Film Award)
Patti LaBelle  (Musical Arts Award)
LA Reid (Business Entertainment Award)
Eric Holder (Public Service Award)
Mellody Hobson (Corporate Citizen Award)

Performers and Presenters
 Usher 
 Ledisi
 Monica
 Babyface
 Fantasia
 The Deele
 Eddie Levert
 Toni Braxton
 Jussie Smollett
 Jazmine Sullivan
 Gabourey Sidibe
 Terrence Howard
 Raheem DeVaughn

Notes

External links
 Official BET website
 Official BET Honors 2008 website
 Official BET Honors 2009 website

American television awards
Awards
Awards established in 2008
Awards disestablished in 2016
Awards honoring African Americans